Carl Elis Daniel Block (12 February 1874 - 6 October 1948) was Bishop of Gothenburg from 1929 till 1948. He was the half-brother of the mathematician Henrik Block and father of the doctor Erik Block and educator Bertil Block. He was a cousin of John Cullberg.

Biography
Block was born in Öxnevalla in Älvsborg County, Sweden to Anders Herder Block, a contractor in Örby, and Charlotta Elisabet Cullberg. Block graduated from the Gothenburg Higher Latin Language School on June 3, 1891, after which he studied in Lund in the fall of 1891, becoming a candidate of philosophy on January 31, 1895. He did his  theoretical exam and practical theological exam on 14 December 1897 and a dissertation trial on September 8, 1910, where he introduced The judgment chapter in his dissertation titled "Kristologien i Hegelsk bearbetning (The Hologram of Hegelian Processing)". He became a doctor of theology on May 31, 1935, and was elected on January 11, 1898. Carl Block became a church councilor in Borås on January 3, 1906. he was also appointed as pastor in Mölndal on July 10, 1915, served as extraordinary chief predictor between 1919 and 1938. He was elected bishop of Gothenburg on February 25, 1929.

He became a bishop in Gothenburg on February 25, 1929. He remain bishop until his death in Gothenburg on 6 October 1948. Block married Elisabet Bolin (1878-1976) on 4 September 1906. They had 5 children: Kerstin (1907-1908), Märta (born 1908), Erik (born 1910), Bertil (born 1912) and Anna-Lisa (born 1915).

References

1874 births
1948 deaths
Swedish Lutheran bishops
20th-century Lutheran bishops
Bishops of Gothenburg